Arna-Bjørnar Fotball is a Norwegian football club from Arna, Bergen.

It was founded in late 2000 as a merger between the football branches from IL Bjørnar and Arna T&IL, and replaced Bjørnar IL in the league system from 2001. The women's team has played since then in the Toppserien apart from the 2005 season when it was in the First divisjon.

Prominent members of the women's team (2009) are goalkeepers Reidun Seth and Erika Skarbø, and Nigerian keeper Precious Dede brought in to cover while Skarbø recovers from a long-term wrist injury. Arna-Bjørnar has earned a reputation for developing young players and the squad includes the former and current Norway Under-19 captains, Maren Mjelde and Kristine Hegland, and prominent former Under-19 players Caroline Walde and Ingrid Ryland, both now Under-23 players, as well as senior international Madeleine Giske who played in the FIFA Women's World Cup 2007. The team has players in Norway's Under-17 team also.

Arna-Bjørnar's women's team is trained by Morten Kalvenes, brother of former Burnley player Christian Kalvenes.

In February 2011 the club had 13 players selected for Norway's international teams at senior level, Under-23, Under-19 and Under-17.

The men's team currently plays in the 3. divisjon, and reached the second round of the Norwegian Football Cup in 2012, when they lost 1–0 to Hødd who won the cup that season.

Women's team

Recent history
{|class="wikitable"
|-bgcolor="#efefef"
! Season
!
! Pos.
! Pl.
! W
! D
! L
! GS
! GA
! P
!Cup
!Notes
|-
|2001
|TS
|align=right bgcolor=cc9966|3
|align=right|18||align=right|13||align=right|2||align=right|3
|align=right|41||align=right|27||align=right|41
|semi-final
|
|-
|2002
|TS
|align=right |5
|align=right|18||align=right|8||align=right|2||align=right|8
|align=right|44||align=right|38||align=right|26
|runner-up
|
|-
|2003
|TS
|align=right |6
|align=right|18||align=right|6||align=right|4||align=right|8
|align=right|43||align=right|48||align=right|22
|final 16
|
|-
|2004
|TS
|align=right bgcolor="#FFCCCC"| 9
|align=right|18||align=right|4||align=right|1||align=right|13
|align=right|31||align=right|54||align=right|13
|quarter-final
|Relegated to 1. divisjon
|-
|2005
|1D
|align=right bgcolor=#DDFFDD| 1
|align=right|18||align=right|17||align=right|1||align=right|0
|align=right|89||align=right|10||align=right|52
|final 16
|Promoted to Toppserien
|-
|2006
|TS
|align=right |5
|align=right|18||align=right|11||align=right|2||align=right|5
|align=right|60||align=right|26||align=right|35
|quarter-final
|
|-
|2007
|TS
|align=right |4
|align=right|22||align=right|12||align=right|4||align=right|6
|align=right|47||align=right|34||align=right|40
|semi-final
|
|-
|2008
|TS
|align=right |5
|align=right|22||align=right|12||align=right|5||align=right|5
|align=right|58||align=right|26||align=right|41
|quarter-final
|
|-
|2009
|TS
|align=right |5
|align=right|22||align=right|9||align=right|6||align=right|7
|align=right|37||align=right|35||align=right|33
|quarter-final
|
|-
|2010
|TS
|align=right |4
|align=right|22||align=right|14||align=right|1||align=right|7
|align=right|55||align=right|26||align=right|43
|semi-final
|
|-
|2011
|TS
|align=right |4
|align=right|22||align=right|16||align=right|1||align=right|5
|align=right|64||align=right|19||align=right|49
|quarter-final
|
|-
|2012
|TS
|align=right bgcolor=cc9966|3
|align=right|22||align=right|14||align=right|5||align=right|3
|align=right|61||align=right|21||align=right|47
|semi-final
|
|-
|2013
|TS
|align=right bgcolor=cc9966|3
|align=right|22||align=right|10||align=right|8||align=right|4
|align=right|39||align=right|24||align=right|38
|quarter-final
|
|-
|2014
|TS
|align=right bgcolor=cc9966|3
|align=right|22||align=right|14||align=right|0||align=right|8
|align=right|58||align=right|21||align=right|42
|second round
|
|-
|2015
|TS
|align=right |7
|align=right|22||align=right|7||align=right|5||align=right|10
|align=right|35||align=right|45||align=right|26
|third round
|
|-
|2016 
|TS
|align=right |8
|align=right|22||align=right|7||align=right|4||align=right|11
|align=right|22||align=right|38||align=right|25
|third round
|
|-
|2017
|TS
|align=right |6
|align=right|22||align=right|9||align=right|8||align=right|5
|align=right|39||align=right|28||align=right|35
|semi-final
|
|-
|2018  
|TS
|align=right bgcolor=cc9966|3
|align=right|22||align=right|11||align=right|6||align=right|5
|align=right|53||align=right|26||align=right|39
|quarter-final
|
|-
|2019 
|TS
|align=right |9
|align=right|22||align=right|6||align=right|5||align=right|11
|align=right|26||align=right|41||align=right|23
|semi-final
|
|-
|2020
|TS
|align=right |8
|align=right|18||align=right|5||align=right|2||align=right|11
|align=right|13||align=right|29||align=right|17
|quarter-final
|
|-
|2021
|TS
|align=right |5
|align=right|18||align=right|6||align=right|3||align=right|9
|align=right|27||align=right|44||align=right|21
|third round
|
|}

Players

Current women's squad

Former players

Honours
Toppserien
Third (5): 2001, 2012, 2013, 2014, 2018

 Norwegian Women's Cup
Runners-up (2): 2000, 2002

Men's team

Recent seasons
{|class="wikitable"
|-bgcolor="#efefef"
! Season
!
! Pos.
! Pl.
! W
! D
! L
! GS
! GA
! P
!Cup
!Notes
|-
|2001
|3. divisjon
|align=right|7
|align=right|22||align=right|8||align=right|3||align=right|11
|align=right|37||align=right|50||align=right|27
|
|
|-
|2002
|3. divisjon
|align=right |9
|align=right|22||align=right|6||align=right|3||align=right|13
|align=right|37||align=right|51||align=right|21
|First round
|
|-
|2003
|3. divisjon
|align=right |8
|align=right|22||align=right|8||align=right|4||align=right|10
|align=right|45||align=right|55||align=right|28
|First qualifying round
|
|-
|2004
|3. divisjon
|align=right |6
|align=right|22||align=right|10||align=right|3||align=right|9
|align=right|37||align=right|49||align=right|33
|First round
|
|-
|2005
|3. divisjon
|align=right |3
|align=right|22||align=right|12||3||align=right|7
|align=right|49||align=right|38||align=right|39
|First qualifying round
|
|-
|2006
|3. divisjon
|align=right |2
|align=right|20||align=right|12||align=right|1||align=right|7
|align=right|41||align=right|30||align=right|37
|First qualifying round
|
|-
|2007
|3. divisjon
|align=right |7
|align=right|22||align=right|9||align=right|2||align=right|11
|align=right|44||align=right|53||align=right|29
|Second qualifying round
|
|-
|2008
|3. divisjon
|align=right |10
|align=right|22||align=right|7||align=right|3||align=right|12
|align=right|48||align=right|58||align=right|24
|Second qualifying round
|
|-
|2009
|3. divisjon
|align=right |4
|align=right|22||align=right|11||align=right|2||align=right|9
|align=right|41||align=right|43||align=right|35
|First qualifying round
|
|-
|2010
|3. divisjon
|align=right |3
|align=right|22||align=right|14||align=right|1||align=right|7
|align=right|67||align=right|36||align=right|43
|First round
|
|-
|2011
|3. divisjon
|align=right |6
|align=right|26||align=right|12||align=right|4||align=right|10
|align=right|52||align=right|41||align=right|42
|Second qualifying round
|
|-
|2012
|3. divisjon
|align=right bgcolor=#DDFFDD| 1
|align=right|26||align=right|19||align=right|4||align=right|3
|align=right|83||align=right|32||align=right|61
|Second round
|Promoted to the 2. divisjon
|-
|2013
|2. divisjon
|align=right bgcolor="#FFCCCC"| 14
|align=right|26||align=right|8||align=right|1||align=right|17
|align=right|28||align=right|67||align=right|25
|First round
|Relegated to the 3. divisjon
|}

References

External links
 Official site

Football clubs in Norway
Association football clubs established in 2000
Sport in Bergen
2000 establishments in Norway